La Coronilla is a village in the Rocha Department of southeastern Uruguay.

Geography
Across Route 9, as a western extension of the village is the hamlet Capacho and as a northern extension the neighbourhood Barrio Pereira. Together they form a populated centre of 1,153 inhabitants, according to the 2011 census.

History
On 13 November 1951, the populated nucleus previously named "Las Maravillas" was renamed and its status was elevated to "Pueblo" (village) by the Act of Ley Nº 11.763.

Population
In 2011 La Coronilla had a population of 510.
 
Source: Instituto Nacional de Estadística de Uruguay

According to the 2011 census, Capacho had a population of 457 and Barrio Pereira of 186.

References

External links
INE map of Capacho, Barrio Pereira and La Coronilla
Article on La Coronilla, Official Portal of the Uruguayan Government

Populated places in the Rocha Department
Seaside resorts in Uruguay